The Stellarton Surface Coal Mine is an open pit reclamation coal mine located in Stellarton, Nova Scotia. It is owned and operated by Pioneer Coal Limited.

Operations
The mine began operations in 1996 and coal is extracted using truck and shovel mining. Coal mining has taken place in this area of Pictou County for more than 400 years, and until the Donkin Mine reopened in 2017, the pit was the only operating coal mine in Nova Scotia. Underground mining previously took place in the area where the Stellarton pit is located and occasionally remnants of the abandoned tunnels from underground mining can be seen on the pit walls. Once coal has been extracted, the surface is restored through reclamation.

In 2014 Pioneer Coal applied to modify the "method of extraction" to include explosives, allowing them to blast through  of rock to access a  seam of coal. The application has raised concerns with the local community. The mine produces about 300,000 tonnes of coal per year. Its principal customer is the Trenton Generating Station.

See also
Pioneer Coal Limited
Westray Mine

References

External links

Surface mines in Canada
Mines in Nova Scotia
Coal mines in Canada
Pictou County